The Women in Film Crystal + Lucy Awards—first presented in 1977 by the now–Los Angeles chapter of the Women in Film organization—were presented to honor women in communications and media. The awards include the Crystal Award, the Lucy Award, the Dorothy Arzner Directors Award, the MaxMara Face of the Future Award, and the Kodak Vision Award.

Crystal Award 
The Crystal Award was established in 1977 to honor outstanding women who, through their endurance and the excellence of their work, have helped to expand the role of women within the entertainment industry.

Recipients 
 2018 – Brie Larson
 2017 – Elizabeth Banks
 2016 – Denise DiNovi, Lianne Halfon, Lynda Obst, Jane Rosenthal, Paula Wagner, Lauren Shuler Donner, Lucy Fisher and Paula Weinstein Taraji P. Henson
 2015 – Nicole Kidman
 2014 – Cate Blanchett
 2013 – Laura Linney
 2012 – Viola Davis
 2011 – Annette Bening
 2010 – Donna Langley
 2009 – Jennifer Aniston
 2008 – Diane English & the ensemble cast of The Women
 2007 – Renée Zellweger
 2006 – Lauren Shuler Donner, Jennifer Lopez, Diane Warren
 2005 – Sandra Bullock, Gesine Prado, Jaime Rucker King, Nina Shaw
 2004 – Gwyneth Paltrow
 2003 – Debra Hill, Nina Jacobson, Diane Lane 
 2002 – Halle Berry, Laura Ziskin 
 2001 – Glenn Close, Whoopi Goldberg, Amy Pascal, Juliet Taylor
 2000 – Barbara Boyle, Jessica Lange, Nikki Rocco
 1999 – Drew Barrymore, Amy Heckerling, Marcia Nasatir, Paula Weinstein 
 1998 – Lucy Fisher, Gale Anne Hurd, Meryl Streep 
 1997 – Goldie Hawn, Diane Keaton, Bette Midler
 1996 – Angela Bassett, Jodie Foster, Audrey Hepburn (posthumously), Anjelica Huston, Buffy Shutt, Kathy Jones
 1995 – Kathleen Kennedy, Meg Ryan, Sharon Stone, Alfre Woodard
 1994 – Nora Ephron, Polly Platt, Joan Plowright, Susan Sarandon
 1993 – Julie Andrews, Kay Koplovitz, Michelle Pfeiffer
 1992 – Maya Angelou, Diahann Carroll, Martha Coolidge, Lily Tomlin 
 1991 – Ruby Dee, Penny Marshall, Jessica Tandy 
 1990 – Marcy Carsey, Jean Firstenberg, Lee Remick 
 1989 – Dawn Steel, Susan Stratton, Fay Wray
 1988 – Suzanne De Passe, Lee Grant, Loretta Young 
 1987 – Dorothy Jeakins, Renee Valente, Ann-Margret 
 1986 – Marilyn Bergman, Marion Dougherty, Sally Field 
 1985 – Lina Wertmüller, Meta Wilde, Elizabeth Taylor
 1984 – Mary Tyler Moore, Brianne Murphy (ASC), Barbra Streisand
 1983 – Margaret Booth, Bette Davis, Ruth Gordon 
 1982 – Dede Allen, Jay Presson Allen, Cicely Tyson, Hannah Weinstein 
 1981 – Verna Fields, Jane Fonda, Sherry Lansing 
 1980 – Carol Burnett, Fay Kanin, Kathleen Nolan 
 1979 – Lillian Gish, Barbara Schultz, Ethel Winant 
 1978 – Lillian Gallo, Pauline Kael, Shirley MacLaine 
 1977 – Lucille Ball, Nancy Malone, Eleanor Perry, Norma Zarky

Lucy Award 
The Lucy Award for Innovation in Television was founded in 1994 by Joanna Kerns, Bonny Dore, and Loreen Arbus. It was named to pay tribute to Lucille Ball and is presented in association with Ball's estate. It is given to recognize women and men and their creative works that have enhanced the perception of women through the medium of television.

Past winners
 2018 - Channing Dungey
 2017 - Tracee Ellis Ross
 2016 – Taraji P. Henson
 2015 – Jill Soloway
 2014 – Kerry Washington
 2013 – The women of Mad Men: Christina Hendricks, January Jones, Elisabeth Moss, Jessica Paré, Kiernan Shipka
 2012 – Bonnie Hammer
 2011 – Nina Tassler
 2010 – Courteney Cox
 2009 – Holly Hunter 
 2008 – Salma Hayek 
 2007 – Shonda Rhimes, the women of Grey's Anatomy
 2006 – Geena Davis 
 2005 – Debra Messing & Megan Mullally 
 2004 – Blythe Danner 
 2003 – Gail Berman-Masters, Stockard Channing, Sheila Nevins, Lily Tomlin 
 2002 – Rosie O'Donnell, Anne Sweeney, Tyne Daly, Amy Brenneman 
 2000 – Marcy Carsey, Phyllis Diller, HBO's If These Walls Could Talk and If These Walls Could Talk 2 (creators/cast: Jane Anderson, Cher, Ellen DeGeneres, Anne Heche, I. Marlene King, Susan Nanus, Nancy Savoca, Sharon Stone, Suzanne Todd, Jennifer Todd, Michelle Williams)
 1999 – Norman Lear, Bud Yorkin, Camryn Manheim, HBO’S Sex and the City (Sarah Jessica Parker, Kim Cattrall, Kristin Davis, Cynthia Nixon)
 1998 – Diahann Carroll, Kay Koplovitz, Barbara Walters, Shari Lewis (posthumously)
 1997 – Carol Burnett,  Roseanne, Jean MacCurdy 
 1996 – Garry Marshall, Marlo Thomas, Angela Lansbury, Madelyn Pugh Davis, Nancy Savoca
 1995 – Tracey Ullman, Elizabeth Montgomery (posthumously), Imogene Coca, Fred Silverman, Brianne Murphy, ASC
 1994 – Linda Bloodworth-Thomason, Gary David Goldberg, Susan Lucci

Dorothy Arzner Directors award 
Dorothy Arzner was the first woman member of the Directors Guild of America. This award was established in her honor to recognize the important role women directors play in both film and television.

Past winners 

 2017 – Mira Nair
 2016 – Lesli Linka Glatter
 2015 – Ava DuVernay
 2014 – Jennifer Lee
 2013 – Sofia Coppola
 2011 – Pamela Fryman
 2010 – Lisa Cholodenko 
 2009 – Catherine Hardwicke
 2007 – Nancy Meyers 
 2006 – Joey Lauren Adams, Lian Lunson, Nicole Holofcener 
 2003 – Debbie Allen 
 2001 – Betty Thomas 
 2000 – Mimi Leder 
 1995 – Gillian Armstrong
 1993 – Barbara Kopple 
 1991–1992 – In the name of Dorothy Arzner, Women In Film recognized 31 American women directors who released theatrical feature films between January 1, 1991, and July 1, 1992. Barbra Streisand accepted the award on behalf of herself and her contemporary female directors.

MAXMARA Face of the Future award 
Inaugurated at the 2006 Crystal+Lucy Awards, this award is given to an actress who is experiencing a turning point in her career through her work in the entertainment industry and through her contributions to the community at large.

Past winners 

 2018 - Alexandra Shipp
 2017 – Zoey Deutch
 2016 – Natalie Dormer
 2015 – Kate Mara
 2014 – Rose Byrne
 2013 – Hailee Steinfeld
 2012 – Chloë Grace Moretz
 2011 – Katie Holmes    
 2010 – Zoe Saldana 
 2009 – Elizabeth Banks 
 2008 – Ginnifer Goodwin 
 2007 – Emily Blunt 
 2006 – Maria Bello

Kodak Vision award 
The Kodak Vision award is presented to a female filmmaker with outstanding achievements in cinematography, directing and/or producing, who also collaborates with and assists women in the entertainment industry.

Past winners 
 2013 – Rachel Morrison
 2012 – Anette Haellmigk
 2011 – Reed Morano
 2010 – Cynthia Pusheck
 2009 – Petra Korner
 2008 – Mandy Walker
 2007 – Uta Briesewitz
 2006 – Maryse Alberti
 2005 – Tami Reiker
 2003 – Pauline Heaton
 2002 – Carolyn Chen 
 2001 – Amy Vincent 
 2000 – Lisa Rinzler, Joan Churchill
 1999 – Ellen Kuras, Teresa Medina 
 1998 – Sandi Sissel (ASC), Liz Ziegler 
 1997 – Nancy Schreiber (ASC), Judy Irola (ASC)
 1996 – Roxanne Di Santo (ASC), Linda Brown(ASC)

International award
Established in 1987, the International award recognizes women whose lives and work have transcended international boundaries.

Past winners
 1997 – Anne V. Coates
 1994 – Jeanne Moreau
 1993 – Catherine Deneuve
 1991 – Liv Ullmann
 1989 – Leslie Caron
 1988 – Agnieszka Holland
 1987 – Agnès Varda

Founder's award
The Founder's award was established in 1996 at the Lucy Awards and was first presented to Tichi Wilkerson Kassel. The award is given in recognition of distinguished service to Women In Film.

Past winners
 2000 – Meredith MacRae (posthumously)
 1999 – Patricia Barry
 1998 – Bonny Dore
 1997 – Irma Kalish
 1996 – Nancy Malone
 1996 – Tichi Wilkerson Kassel

Paltrow Mentorship award
The Paltrow Mentorship award, in honor of the late director and mentor Bruce Paltrow, is awarded to an entertainment industry professional, who in the course of their career, has shown an extraordinary commitment to mentoring and supporting the next generation of filmmakers and executives.

Past winners
 2015 - Sue Kroll
 2008 – Sherry Lansing
 2007 – Kathleen Kennedy

Norma Zarky Humanitarian award
The Norma Zarky Humanitarian award was established in 1979 and is presented to individuals who have demonstrated enlightened support for the advancement of equal opportunity for all and devotion to the improvement of the human condition.

Past winners
 2017 - Dan Rather
 2014 – Eva Longoria
 2013 – George Lucas
 2012 – Christina Applegate
 2011 – Elizabeth Taylor
 2008 – Jeffrey Katzenberg
 2002 – David Foster, Linda Thompson
 2001 – Pierce Brosnan, Keely Shaye Smith
 2000 – Pauletta and Denzel Washington
 1999 – Ted Turner
 1998 – Tichi Wilkerson Kassel
 1997 – Michele Singer-Reiner and Rob Reiner
 1996 – Jane Alexander
 1994 – Danny Glover
 1993 – Mike Farrell
 1992 – Lilly Tartikoff
 1991 – Whoopi Goldberg, Billy Crystal, Robin Williams
 1990 – Gary David Goldberg
 1989 – Edward James Olmos
 1988 – Stacey and Henry Winkler
 1987 – Valerie Harper, Dennis Weaver
 1986 – Quincy Jones
 1985 – Jean Stapleton
 1983 – Carmen Zapata
 1981 – Gene Reynolds
 1979 – Gareth Wigan

Nancy Malone Directors award

The Nancy Malone Directors Award recognizes emerging women directors who have demonstrated a passionate commitment to filmmaking.

Past winners
 2009 – Megan Mylan
 2008 – Cynthia Wade

Women of Courage award
The Women of Courage award was established in 1992 to recognize women who persevere through adverse conditions and circumstances in their quest for the rights of all women in the entertainment industry and society at large.

Past winners
 1994 – Elizabeth Glaser (posthumously)
 1993 – Peg Yorkin
 1992 – Nina Totenberg

Martini Shot Mentor award
On a film set, the last shot of the day is called the Martini Shot. The Martini Shot award honors men who recognize and acknowledge the talent and ideas of women in the entertainment industry.

Past winners
 1999 – Steven Bochco, Danny DeVito, George Lucas, Bill Mechanic, Forest Whitaker
 1998 – Frank Mancuso, Edgar J. Scherick, Casey Silver, Steven Spielberg, Jim Wiatt, John Cassavetes (posthumously)

Women in Film Business Leadership award
This award was created to honor women from the business side of the industry, in the boardroom and behind the camera.

Past winners
 2008 – Susanne Daniels, Rena Ronson
 2007 – Iris Grossman, Michelle Slater
 2006 – Elizabeth M. Daley, Diane Golden

Artistic Excellence Award

Past winners
 2018 - Nova Wav

Lexus Beacon Award

Past winners
 2018 The Women of Black Panther – in front of and behind the camera
 2017 Michael Barker & Tom Bernard

Sue Mengers Award
"For excellence in artistic representation"

Past winners
 2016 - Hylda Queally
 2015 - Toni Howard

See also

 List of American television awards
 List of media awards honoring women

References

Women's film organizations
Mass media awards honoring women
Film organizations in the United States
Organizations based in Los Angeles
Film acting awards
Film directing awards
Film editing awards
American television awards
 
American film awards
Awards established in 1977